Copyright in Cameroon generally lasts for life plus 50 years.

Cameroon has entered into the following copyright agreements:

 Berne Convention for the Protection of Literary and Artistic Works - 21 September 1964
 Universal Copyright Convention (Geneva) - 1 May 1973
 Universal Copyright Convention (Paris) - 10 July 1974
 Agreement on Trade-Related Aspects of Intellectual Property Rights - 13 December 1995

References

External links
https://commons.wikimedia.org/wiki/Commons:Copyright_rules_by_territory/Cameroon

Cameroon
Law of Cameroon